Chionodes hodgesorum is a moth in the family Gelechiidae. It is found in North America, where it has been recorded from the gypsum dunes at White Sands National Park in New Mexico.

Etymology
The species is named in honor of Ronald W. Hodges and his wife Elaine.

References

Chionodes
Moths described in 2014
Moths of North America